Bara brith is a traditional Welsh tea bread flavoured with tea, dried fruits and spices.

A decrease in its popularity led to supermarket Morrisons removing it from their shelves in 2006, and a year later a survey showed that 36% of teenagers in Wales had never tried it. It has been subsequently championed by celebrity chefs such as Bryn Williams. Several variations on bara brith have been made, including changing it into a chocolate and into ice cream.

History
Bara Brith derived its name from the Welsh language,  meaning bread and  translating as speckled. It is claimed to have been invented by a Welsh chef who added dried fruit and spices to a bread dough, creating the first version of the traditional Welsh tea loaf. It has subsequently been used as a colloquialism—to "over spice the Bara Brith" means to do something to excess.

In 2006, British supermarket chain Morrisons withdrew Bara Brith from sale at 19 of its Wales-based stores. Complaints were issued in the Press, but the company insisted that the bread was removed because of lack of sales. A survey conducted by British supermarket chain Sainsbury's in 2007, showed that 36% of teenagers in Wales surveyed had never tried Bara Brith. When responses across the UK were viewed, some 85% of teenagers had never tried the traditional Welsh bread.

He used a traditional recipe which had been handed down to local chef Nerys Roberts through her family. Her bakery had previously supplied British supermarket chain Safeway with Bara Brith, before it was bought out by Morrisons. Beca Lyne-Pirkis baked a Bara Brith for one her entries during the fourth season of the BBC television series The Great British Bake Off in 2013. Although she based it on her grandmother's recipe, she found it difficult to complete within the three hours allocated for that round. But, it won praise from judges Paul Hollywood and Mary Berry.

Recipe
The bread is made by mixing flour (either white or self-raising), yeast (if not using self-raising flour), butter, mixed dried fruit (such as raisins, currants and sultanas), mixed spices and an egg. Some recipes favour soaking the dried fruit in tea overnight before the baking. This mixture is then proved to allow fermentation to take place. After an initial period, the air is knocked out of the mixture and it is allowed to prove once more. This period of preparation can take up to two hours, including the resting time for the bread mixture. It is then baked in an oven. Bara Brith is traditionally served at tea time, alongside tea. It is normally served in slices with butter spread on one side.

Variations
One of the most traditional foods coming out of the Chubut valleys, it was brought by the Welsh settlers who started arriving in the country in 1865. Other variations exist within Wales. Lyne-Pirkis' version of the Bara Brith on The Great British Bake Off substituted a tea oil to replace the overnight soaking process for the fruit. In E. Smith Twiddy's The Little Welsh Cookbook, a cup of cold tea is included in the mixture, and marmalade is used as a glaze. Celebrity chef Bryn Williams uses lard in his recipe, and a combination of raisins and candied peel as the mixed fruit.

The flavours of a Bara Brith have also been made into other types of food. Pemberton's Victorian Chocolates in Llanboidy, Carmarthenshire, developed a Bara Brith-inspired chocolate in 2009, using a tea-flavoured cream-filled chocolate complemented with dried fruit and possessing a cake-like texture. When Charles, Prince of Wales visited Ammanford, Carmarthenshire, in 2011, he tried Bara Brith ice-cream. It had been created by a local ice-cream parlour who knew of the Prince's fondness for the bread.

See also
 Barmbrack

References

External links

Argentine cuisine
British breads
Sweet breads
Welsh cuisine
Yeast cakes
British tea culture
British cakes